"Up!" is a song co-written and recorded by Canadian country music singer Shania Twain. It is the title track and second country single from her 2002 album of the same name. The song was written by Twain and her then-husband, Robert John "Mutt" Lange. "Up!" was originally released to North American country radio on January 6, 2003. "I'm Not in the Mood (To Say No)!" was to be released to pop radio alongside "Up!" but this release was cancelled. It was released as a double A-side single with "When You Kiss Me" to the UK on November 17, 2003, and issued as the sixth and final single in Europe on March 8, 2004. At the 2004 Juno Awards, "Up!" was named Country Recording of the Year.

Critical reception
Reviews for "Up!" were favorable. Billboard magazine described the song as being "life-loving [and] instantly singable," and predicted "this one sounds like it's got the goods to go the distance". About.com praised the song’s technical side by saying "[t]he production is solid and Shania's tone is as good as ever vocally".

Music video
The music video for "Up!" was shot by Antti J in Madrid, alongside some scenes for the video of "Ka-Ching!". It was filmed in early January 2003 and released on January 11, 2003. All three album versions of the song were released: Red, Green and Blue. The video shows Twain in a white room, decorating a wall with memorabilia and photographs related to Shania. These include a glove from the "That Don't Impress Me Much" video, an AC/DC t-shirt worn on her Rolling Stone magazine cover, one picture of her parents, another with her dog, a Montreal Canadiens jersey and a Canadian flag. The video won the MuchMoreMusic Video of the Year Award at the 2003 MuchMusic Video Awards. Commercially it is available on select CD singles, the DVD-Audio version of Up! and at the iTunes Store.

Chart performance
"Up!" debuted on the Billboard Hot Country Singles & Tracks chart the week of November 16, 2002, at number 57, based on album play alone, yet was still the highest debut of the week. The single spent 20 weeks on the chart and climbed to a peak position of number 12 on March 8, 2003, where it remained for one week. "Up!" became Twain's eighteenth top twenty single. On the Billboard Hot 100, "Up!" peaked at number 63 and at number 62 on the Hot 100 Airplay chart.

While "Up!" underperformed in most of Europe, it managed to hit number two on Canada's sales chart and number three on Hungary's airplay chart.

Promotion
As one of the first singles released from the Up! album, it was performed on several televised programs to boost airplay and sales. The first performance was in Edmonton at the 2002 Grey Cup. Two days later, in New York City, the song was performed on The Today Show. Twain headed to Australia to promote the album, where she performed the song on Rove Live. Back in the United States, the song was performed in a medley with "I'm Gonna Getcha Good!" at the American Music Awards. The next day, Twain performed the song on The Tonight Show with Jay Leno. In April 2003, Twain opened the Juno Awards with "Up!". The most-watched performance of the song was in the Super Bowl XXXVII halftime show, where it was performed alongside "Man! I Feel Like a Woman!".

Track listings

UK maxi single
 "Up!" (green version)
 "Up!" (red version)
 "Up!" (video enhancement)

Australia CD single—part 1
 "Up!" (red version) – 2:54
 "You're Still the One" (live) – 3:29
 "I'm Holdin' On to Love (To Save My Life)" (live) – 3:30

Australia CD single—part 2
 "Up!" (green version) – 2:53
 "I'm Gonna Getcha Good!" (Sowatt extended dance mix) – 7:57
 "Ka-Ching!" (The Simon & Diamond bhangra mix) – 4:36

Canada CD single
 "Up!" (red version) – 2:53
 "I'm Gonna Getcha Good!" (Sowatt extended dance mix) – 7:57

Europe maxi-CD
 "Up!" (red version) – 2:56
 "Forever and for Always" (Live from Up! Live in Chicago) – 4:12
 "When You Kiss Me" (Live from Up! Live in Chicago) – 4:18
 Enhanced: "Up!" (video)

Europe CD single
 "Up! (red version) – 2:56
 "Forever and for Always" (Live from Up! Live in Chicago) – 4:16

Germany 3-inch CD single
 "Up!" (red version) – 2:52
 "Forever and for Always" (Live from Up! Live in Chicago) – 3:59

UK and Japan Dual Disc

CD side:
 "Up!" (red version) – 2:53
 "Up!" (green version) – 2:53
 (Bonus Track 1) "I'm Gonna' Get Ya Good!" (red version)
 (Bonus Track 2) "I'm Gonna' Get Ya Good" (green version)
DVD side:
 "Up!" (green version) (video)
 "I'm Gonna' Get Ya Good!" (red version) (video only)
 Photo gallery
 Bonus live video: In My Car, I'll Be the Driver (Clifford version)

Charts

Weekly charts

Year-end charts

Certifications

References

2002 songs
2003 singles
2004 singles
Mercury Nashville singles
Mercury Records singles
Shania Twain songs
Song recordings produced by Robert John "Mutt" Lange
Songs written by Robert John "Mutt" Lange
Songs written by Shania Twain